The House that Lives is a historic house at 83 Watchung Avenue in Montclair, Essex County, New Jersey, United States.

It was built in 1922 with Modern Movement and Tudor Revival elements. The house was added to the National Register of Historic Places in 1988.

The house received its name from the Upper Montclair Women's Club, which exhibited the house during its "Better Homes Week" in June 1923.

See also 
 National Register of Historic Places listings in Essex County, New Jersey

References

Houses on the National Register of Historic Places in New Jersey
Houses completed in 1922
Houses in Essex County, New Jersey
Montclair, New Jersey
National Register of Historic Places in Essex County, New Jersey
New Jersey Register of Historic Places